Ilario Pegorari (9 January 1949 – 17 August 1982) was an Italian alpine skier.

Career
Pegorari was twice Italian champion (Slalom 1972, Combined 1973). Best results were a 2nd place (Slalom Mt. St. Anne/4 March 1973) and a third place (Slalom Naeba/13 March 1973).

Death
While visiting Mount Tongariro on a day off from training, Pegorari died in a car accident, along with skier Bruno Nöckler and several others.

References

External links
 

1949 births
1982 deaths
Italian male alpine skiers
Italian alpine skiing coaches